E. M. Laird Airplane Company  was an American aircraft manufacturer of commercial aircraft and custom race planes.

History

Wichita Airplane Company 

Emil Matthew Laird partnered with the founders of the Wichita Airplane Company to build a new commercial biplane aircraft in 1920. The E.M Laird Company built 45 Swallow aircraft of this design. The company turned down an offer to move to Monmouth, Illinois in 1922. E.M Laird sold all rights on 27 September 1923 to J. M Mollendick, and formed a new company, the E. M. Laird Airplane Company based out of Chicago. The original E. M. Laird Company then became the Swallow Airplane Company, retaining brother Charles Laird. Charles Laird concurrently started a short lived aircraft company named Laird Aircraft Corporation, publicly known as Whipporwhill in order to differentiate himself from Emil.

E.M. Laird Aircraft 

The E.M. Laird Aircraft company returned to Laird's hometown, building facilities at Ashburn Field, in Ashburn, Chicago. By 1928, Laird's aircraft had reached a level quality and competition, that the Stout Metal Airplane Division of the Ford Motor Company offered to hire Laird, and purchase all the assets of his company.

Aircraft

References

External links
 Laird, Laird-Swallow, Laird-Turner – Aerofiles

Defunct aircraft manufacturers of the United States